Tubo may refer to:

 Tibet, called Tubo or Tufan in Chinese historical texts
 Tibetan Empire (618–842)
Tubo (mythology), an underworld deity in chinese mythology
 Tubo, Abra, the Philippines
 Tubo Fernández (born 1959), Argentine footballer